Luna Negra Dance Theater was a dance ensemble that celebrated the richness and diversity of Latino culture through the creation of works by contemporary Latino choreographers. Founded by Cuban-born dancer and choreographer Eduardo Vilaro, the company steered away from folkloric representations and utilized a variety of dance form styles such as Flamenco, Tango, or Salsa with contemporary dance movement. 

Luna Negra made its home in Chicago at the Harris Theater in Millennium Park, and toured nationally and internationally.  It focused on the work of Latin choreographers such as,  Ron DeJesus, Vicente Nebrada, Gustavo Ramirez Sansano, and Annabelle Lopez Ochoa.  The company performed in Chicago at Ravinia Festival, The Harris Theater for Music and Dance, Symphony Center, The Dance Center of Columbia College, Dance Chicago, the Ruth Page Dance Series locally and had toured nationally and internationally to places such as  Spain, Panama, and Mexico.  The dance ensemble made its New York City debut at the New Victory Theater in January 2008. In the community Luna Negra offered intensive, hands-on education programs that encouraged discovery and exploration of personal and community identity .

When the Harris Theater opened in 2003, it provided an aspiration for small dance companies such as Luna Negra.  Luna Negra quickly achieved its goal of performing there, and it celebrated its tenth season at the Harris Theater in September 2008.  In past seasons, it cohabitated with the Joffrey Ballet, Hubbard Street Dance Chicago, and Concert Dance Inc. at Ravinia Festival.  The company also performed on the schedule at Ravinia without these other Chicago dance companies.  In its summer 2008 season, Luna Negra was the opening performance for Ravinia Festival.

In 2010, Luna Negra welcomed Gustavo Ramirez Sansano as its second artistic director in the company's history. Under Mr. Ramirez's leadership Luna Negra continued to soar with explosive and imaginative works that challenged cultural representations and developed new possibilities for the company. In 2013 Luna Negra ceased operations due to financial stress.

Notes

External links
Archival Footage of the Luna Negra Dance Theatre Company performing at the Jacob's Pillow Dance Festival in 2012
Interview with Eduardo Vilaro discussing his directorship of Luna Negra 

Hispanic and Latino American organizations
Arts organizations established in 1999
Dance companies in Chicago
Hispanic and Latino American culture in Chicago
1999 establishments in Illinois